Mireille Mathieu (born 22 July 1946) is a French singer. She has recorded over 1200 songs in eleven languages, with more than 122 million records sold worldwide.

Biography and career

Early years
Mireille Mathieu was born on 22 July 1946 in Avignon, France, the eldest daughter of a family of fourteen children; the youngest brother was born after she moved to Paris. Her father Roger and his family were native to Avignon, while her mother Marcelle-Sophie (née Poirier) was from Dunkirk. She arrived in Avignon in 1944 as a refugee from World War II after her grandmother had died, and her mother went missing. Roger, with his father Arcade, ran the family stonemason shop just outside the Saint-Véran cemetery main gate. The Mathieu family have been stonemasons for four generations. Today the shop is named Pompes Funèbres Mathieu-Mardoyan, owned and managed by her sister Réjane's family.

The Mathieu family lived in poverty, with a huge improvement in their living conditions in 1954, when subsidized housing was built in the Malpeigné  quarter near the cemetery. Then again in 1961 they moved to a large tenement in the Croix des Oiseaux quarter southeast of the city.

Roger had once dreamed of becoming a singer, but his father Arcade disapproved, inspiring him to have one of his children learn to sing with him in church. Mathieu included her father's operatic voice on her 1968 Christmas album, where it was mixed in with the Minuit Chrétiens song. Mathieu's first paid performance before an audience, at age four, was rewarded with a lollipop when she sang on Christmas Eve 1950 during Midnight Mass. A defining moment was seeing Édith Piaf sing on television.

Mathieu performed poorly in elementary school because of dyslexia, requiring an extra year to graduate. She was born left-handed, and her teachers used a ruler to strike her hand each time she was caught writing with it. She became right-handed, although her left hand remains quite animated while singing. She has a fantastic memory, and never uses a prompter on stage. Abandoning higher education, at age 14 (1961), and after moving to Croix des Oiseaux, she began work in a local factory in Montfavet (a suburb southeast of town) where she helped with the family income and paid for her singing lessons. Popular at work, she often sang songs at lunch, or while working. Like her parents, she is a short woman at 1.52 m (5 feet) in height. Her sister Monique, born on 8 July 1947, began work at the same factory a few months later. Both were given bicycles on credit to commute with, making for very long days, and many bad memories of riding against the mistral winds. The factory went out of business, so Mathieu and two sisters (Monique, and Christiane) became youth counselors at a summer camp before her rise to fame, a summer where she had her fortune told by Tarot cards by an old Gypsy woman, saying she would soon mingle with kings and queens.

Mathieu is Roman Catholic, and her adopted patron saint is Saint Rita, the Saint for the Impossible. Mathieu's paternal grandmother Germaine née Charreton, assured her that Saint Rita was the one to intercede to God for hopeless cases. Beyond religion, like many artists, she is unabashed about superstition and luck. When asked to reveal some of her superstitions, she said: "The most important one is to never mention any of them." She has stage fright, and can often be seen making the sign of the cross before moving out on stage.

Debut (1962–1965)
Mathieu began her career by participating in an annual singing contest in Avignon called On Chante dans mon Quartier (We sing in my neighborhood). Photos depict the affair as rather drab with a cheap curtain and one projector light. The stage was only twenty feet square, and the singer had to share it with a large piano and musicians. A large, boisterous, and mostly young audience was very much in evidence. The judges sat at a table in front of and below the elevated stage. Anyone who signed the contract in the weeks before the show was allowed to sing. Talent scouts made this a worthwhile event for singers to participate in from hundreds of miles around.

Mathieu's private singing lessons were by Madame Laure Collière, who was also a piano teacher in Avignon. Self-described as very stubborn in her autobiography, she wrote about singing love songs that the audience thought inappropriate for a young girl, thus losing to Michèle Torr in 1962 when she sang "Les cloches de Lisbonne" at the first contest, and losing again in 1963 singing Édith Piaf's "L'Hymne à l'amour". In 1964, though, she won the event with another Piaf song: "La Vie en rose".

Her win was rewarded with a free trip to Paris, and a pre-audition for the televised talent show Jeu de la Chance (Game of Luck), where amateur singers competed for audience and telephone votes. Her participation and train fare were arranged by Raoul Colombe, the deputy mayor of Avignon. Accompanied by a pianist at the studio, and dressed in black like Piaf, she sang two Piaf songs to the audition judges and left dispirited: Parisians at the studio made fun of her Provençal accent, and her dyslexia scrambled words. For example, her sister and current manager Monique, is called "Matite" because Mathieu could not pronounce "petite" as a child.

During a 1965 summer gala, added to the Enrico Macias concert by Raoul Colombe (her first manager), she met her future manager Johnny Stark. Mathieu and her father both thought he was an American based on his name and manner, and nicknamed him l'Américain. Stark had worked with singers such as Yves Montand, and the relationship between him and Mathieu is often described as resembling that between Colonel Tom Parker and Elvis Presley. Stark is credited with making her a star and the successor to Piaf. By 1968, under his careful management, she was France's most popular singer.

Breakthrough (1965–1967)

Mathieu was invited to Paris by the impresario Régis Durcourt to sing on the Song Parade television programme, on 19 November 1965. Johnny Stark had promised to write to her, but after months of waiting she gave up on him, and accepted Durcourt's offer. The truth has never been revealed how, but Mathieu was suddenly moved up to compete live on the Sunday 21 November 1965 episode of Jeu de la Chance, a talent segment of the popular French programme Télé-Dimanche. Stark's ex-wife Nanou Taddéi worked at Studio 102, and probably recognized Mathieu, as she participated in her earlier pre-audition. Mathieu explained that Song Parade offered only one chance to sing, while "Jeu de la Chance" offered many chances to sing, but only if she won, and she intended to win. Both the studio audience and telephone voters gave her a slight lead over five-time winner Georgette Lemaire, so the producers called it a tie. Stark officially became her manager that night, and with his longtime assistant Nadine Joubert, helped prepare Mathieu to win the contest the following week and defeat Lemaire. Stark and Lemaire had a mutual dislike. In a short film called La guerre des Piaf (War of the Sparrows), Mathieu and Lemaire are interviewed separately, both the same diminutive height. Mathieu is surrounded by her sisters Monique and Christiane, with Stark hovering in the background as she is interviewed for the first time on camera. She appears to be uncomfortable, staring at the floor during many of the questions, even looking dumbfounded at one point. Stark finally comes to her rescue. In a later interview, she underscored the importance of the event, stating, "For me, Paris was the end of the world. I had never taken a train or seen a camera before. I did not know what the outcome of the adventure would be."

In the middle of her seven consecutive performances on Télé-Dimanche she performed a concert at the Paris Olympia, which propelled her to stardom. She signed with Bruno Coquatrix, the owner of the Olympia, on 20 December, and performed the only three Piaf songs she had memorized, two days later. She was hailed in the press, in France and abroad, as the Piaf d'Avignon (Sparrow of Avignon), in reference to Piaf's nickname "Sparrow of the Streets".

All was not going well at this point. Mathieu said "I was managed to such mimicry of my idol that I thought I was not able to do anything else. It was instantly one of the biggest disappointments of my life." Stark then abandoned the Piaf direction he was taking her in. The Olympia performance convinced a skeptical Paul Mauriat to work with Mireille, and songwriter André Pascal joined forces to develop her into a successful act. Together they wrote new modern material for her: Mon crédo, Viens dans ma rue, La première étoile and many other hit songs. Her first album En Direct de L'Olympia, on the Barclay label, was released in 1966. Highly acclaimed, along with the singles and EP's from it, the album made her a star outside France.

A regular early contributor of material was Francis Lai, who wrote two songs, C'est ton nom, and Un homme et une femme for her first album, and who often accompanied her with his accordion on television. Her first record was recorded in the EMI studios, with Paul Mauriat's band. Mathieu's success led her record company, Barclay, to claim that they controlled 40% of the French pop record market.

Mathieu spent all of 1966 and 1967 touring. It was then, during a car journey to another concert, that Stark advised Mathieu that she was finally debt-free, and worth more than a million francs (US$200k in 1967). She had always prayed that she could get her family out of poverty, but the touring and singing were much more important at the time. In her autobiography, she stated her first major purchases were a vehicle for her father's business and a large home for her parents and siblings. Most importantly, she had a telephone installed for the family, so her parents no longer had to go to the pharmacy to talk to her while she was in Paris. Her one regret, was that she was unable to see her grandmother Germaine in the hospital before she died because of all the tour contracts.

Mathieu arrived in Paris with two dresses and a change of underwear, and Stark set her up in style, sent for Mathieu's two eldest sisters, and let them go shopping for a week. He then rented her a home and a maid in the smart district of Neuilly after she had won, and made sure she only had her singing to worry about. Stark recorded all the expenses though, and he was fully compensated before a franc was ever put in Mathieu's account.

Mathieu sang  at the London Palladium during royal performances (before the Queen and her family), once in 1967 with further performances in 1969 and 1981. Following her second performance, her French cover of Engelbert Humperdinck's "The Last Waltz" (La dernière valse) generated much publicity in Great Britain and became a hit record even though the original had been number one only a few months previously. She also toured Canada and the United States, where she appeared on The Ed Sullivan Show and the Danny Kaye Show. While on a visit to Hollywood, she met Elvis Presley, and in Las Vegas, Nevada sang with Dean Martin and Frank Sinatra.

Career in the 20th century (1967–2000)
Although the popularity of Mathieu's genre has declined, given the domination of rock and roll and the global lack of interest in non-English popular music during her most profitable years, she remained a popular artist in France and Europe. Many thousands of fans have met her before and after performances for autographs and to wish her well over the years, and the common refrain is how well she treats her fans. She easily interacts with the public. While the Mathieu sisters are quite wealthy, they have also made their songwriters extremely wealthy. Most of the record profits go to the authors, whereas Mathieu had to tour and perform concerts live and on television.

While on tour in February 1968, Mathieu was in a car accident in which she fractured one of her vertebrae; the injury incapacitated her for three months. She writes in her book, that they received a note which said "we will get you next time" but it was not proved to be anything but an accident.

In 1971, Barclay was unable to meet the demand for records. Stark then made a contract for Philips Records to issue all the singles and EPs, resulting in a million-dollar lawsuit from Barclay for breach of contract. Barclay's contract was scheduled to run until 1972.

In 1972, Mathieu toured Canada and produced a live album. Stark had his first heart attack while making arrangements for this concert.

In 1974, Mathieu formed her own publishing company Abilene Music. Today this company is involved in the publishing and printing of Music material.

In 1983, Mathieu formed another publishing company, Abilene Disc. This is the company used to publish recordings, and her management agency run by her sisters Monique and Christiane.

In 1985, Mathieu joined Plácido Domingo in performing a children's show called The Tales of Cri-Cri. This television special used puppets along with fifty-years of traditional Mexican songs, producing popular versions in Spanish, French and English. Mathieu's father Roger died this same year.

In 1986, Mathieu came back in Paris with tremendous concerts in Palais des Congres (more than 100,000 spectators in one month, sold out concerts); then she performed in China, with a French television crew for TF1 filming Mireille Mathieu in China. In her autobiography, she states she was the first Western performer to give a concert in the city, but this was in error, as at least two other Western performances preceded hers.

 In 1988, W. Kordes' Söhne, a German rose-breeding company, introduced the Mireille Mathieu Rose to match her favorite lipstick color. Mathieu also published her autobiography with co-author Jacqueline Cartier. The title is Oui je crois, "Yes, I Believe", which is taken from the lyrics of Mon crédo, her first recording. The book was seen as a final chapter in her career and Stark was also exhausted and overweight by this time. Pierre Delanoë wrote a passionate song about Joan of Arc in La Demoiselle d'Orléans for Mathieu. The final lyric: "When I think of all I have given France... and she has forgotten me  She used her fists in punching the air while singing the song.

On the accusations of being docile, Mathieu writes in her autobiography that she and Stark understood each other. She wanted to be a singer, and he was tired of people who just wanted to be famous. They were both hard workers, and he kept her schedule filled with lucrative contracts. She also writes that she was forbidden to read the press, and, having peeked at some of it, was content to follow that rule. Stark, of course, had a heavy hand in manipulating the press. Mathieu writes that her mother was often surprised to read on the front page that she was engaged to someone famous, or was going to be in a movie by some famous director. Her guiding principle was just to sing, and never have her family return to the tenements of Croix des Oiseaux.

Many photographs and films from the early years show the life around Stark's villa in Roquefort-la-Bédoule (south of France). The villa, also named La Bédoule, allowed everyone to escape from Paris and relax. The home supported Stark's telephone addiction with 28 telephones, with each car also having a phone. Mathieu lived here with her aunt Irène, and brothers and sisters would often visit. The pool was designed to be shallow all around, and deep in the center, as Mathieu has a fear of drowning, and never learned to swim. The property was sold after Stark's divorce.

In 1989, President François Mitterrand invited Mathieu to sing a tribute to General Charles de Gaulle. Stark died the same year after his second heart attack. Divorced and estranged from his family, Stark was entombed in the mausoleum Mathieu in Avignon. Upon Stark's death, everyone said that no one could replace him, and it proved true, but by then the entertainment press had also matured.

Stark left behind a legal "bloody mess". It took Mathieu and her lawyers years to close out and process his estate. "I was severely depressed, but I got out without needing analysis." The most controversial event of Mathieu's career, according to the media of the time, occurred when she took over Stark's office, and ended her business relationship with Nadine Joubert. In an interview for Paris Match in 2002, Mathieu said: "I realized that people I trusted stole my money: so I fired everyone!"

Mathieu's sister Monique stepped in to become her business manager. Stark wanted Pascal Auriat to succeed him, but Auriat died three months before Stark. She performed again in Palais des Congres in November and December 1990 with a special 2-hour concert without intermission, a new hair cut, like Louise Brooks and a very simple black dress created by French couturier Pierre Cardin. Unfortunately that was during First Gulf War, so these concerts had fewer spectators than in 1986 and some performances had to be cancelled, too few tickets having been sold.

In 1993, she tried a come-back with two albums devoted to her idol, Édith Piaf: Mireille Mathieu chante Pïaf in French and Unter dem Himmel von Paris in German. She sold 100,000 copies of the French album which was also available in the United States.

In November 1995, she recorded the new album Vous lui direz..., produced by Michel Jourdan for East West. New songs, new authors like Maxime Leforestier who wrote for Mathieu "A la moitié de la distance". Mathieu adapted this album to the German In meinem Traum with 2 mini-CD.

In 1998 she performed in Olympia Paris and released a compilation Son grand numéro with new record label EMI. In this compilation there was a cover of Toni Braxton's hit "Unbreak my heart", in French "Reste avec moi".

In 1999, Mathieu released another German album, Alles nur ein Spiel, with some modern songs, with a techno sound ("C'est ça l'amour", "Wenn die Sehnsucht erwacht").

Career in the 21st century (2001–present)
In 2002, Mathieu released her thirty-seventh French album: De tes mains (EMI), followed by a series of concerts at the Paris Olympia in November and a tour in France, Belgium and Switzerland. Reviews in the French press were quite good and the public gave Mathieu standing ovations every evening.

Mathieu celebrated the fortieth anniversary of her career at the Paris Olympia on 24 November 2005, and released her thirty-eighth French album: Mireille Mathieu, produced by Patrick Hampartzoumian who wrote the main title "Une place dans mon coeur". The performance, and an interview, were recorded and released in wide-screen DVD format in 2006; however, the DVD was in European video format only. 

In 2007, Mathieu supported presidential candidate Nicolas Sarkozy, the mayor of Neuilly. Sarkozy was elected President of France and, ex officio, co-prince of Andorra. 

On 1 November 2008, she was a guest of Prime Minister Vladimir Putin in Moscow, and performed a concert in his honor. The two visited the tent of visiting Libyan leader Muammar Gaddafi.

In November 2010, she was awarded the Russian Medal of Friendship by President Dmitry Medvedev at a State Dinner. She was in Russia and the Baltic States throughout November, returning to Paris after a concert in Warsaw, Poland on 28 November. In January 2011, Mireille was promoted from Chevalier (9 December 1999) to Officier of the Légion d'honneur.

In November 2011, Mathieu cancelled her concert in Israel for the second time in 2011. The promoter again failed to meet the required ticket sales.

In March 2012, Mathieu, with Jean Claudric and his Orchestra, were in Siberia, Russia visiting three cities: Perm (21 March), Tyumen (24 March), and Yekaterinburg (26 March).

During an interview in Moscow, Mathieu mentioned that the group Pussy Riot had committed a sacrilege in the church by having a political demonstration against President Putin. French television program "On n'est pas couché" edited out the second half of her statement, and called her a tool of President Putin. Her lawyer André Schmidt sued the station for defamation. The suit was dismissed at trial in July 2014. The part that was edited out was "as a woman artist and a Christian, I beg the indulgence of these three girls." The group of three women were convicted and sentenced to two years in prison for being hooligans, and inciting religious hatred.

In October 2012, Mathieu announced on her web page that she is re-releasing her Chante Piaf, with two new recordings added, in celebration of her 50th year as a singer, and the 50th year of Piaf's death. Also that month, she had to cancel some of her shows in Russia (Rostov, Volgograd, Samara, and Ufa). She had contracted these shows through a Yekaterinburg company called Mix Art, through her Malta agent Foresa Investment Ltd. She stated that Mix Art "acted in a highly unprofessional and even fraudulent way." She was able to salvage the tours on 3 November 2012 in Moscow, 5 November 2012 in Saint Petersburg and 7 November 2012 in Krasnodar. She also performed the rescheduled concert in Ufa on 7 March 2013.

In December 2013, her lawyers won a lawsuit against MGM Home Entertainment for failing to compensate her production company Abilene Disc for the 1967 song Les Yeux de l'amour (The Eyes of Love), used in the German version of the movie Casino Royale. Since 2009, she has been the main guest star of the Spasskaya Tower Military Music Festival and Tattoo, held on Moscow's Red Square. On 5 September 2013, during her concert event of the festival, she sang in a light dress under an icy rain and a gusty wind, refusing to take an offer for a coat as disrespectful to the people freezing in the stands. Russian TV's Culture channel praised her performance on that day as a feat.

Mathieu had an active tour schedule for 2014, celebrating her 50th year in show business (she dates her career from the year she won her first singing contest in Avignon). Her first concert was going to be in Kiev, and she held out hope it would go on, but finally cancelled it seven days before "due to the instability." Her France 50th Anniversary tour ran from October to November 2014.

Mathieu performed her 50th Anniversary tour in Germany and Austria from 1 to 16 March 2015, singing at sold-out venues in twelve different cities. She credits her sister-manager Monique for keeping the general audience ticket prices reasonable.

In March 2015, she announced on her web page that all the concerts in Russia were cancelled "due to the economic situation." On the concert web site, it states that the Russian currency had collapsed, and it was no longer possible to finance the concert and travel arrangements.

On 26 May 2015, Mathieu sang at the "Culture Without Borders" (Culture sans frontière) project at the UNESCO headquarters in Paris. She took part at a concert titled The Allies of the Great Victory: A Musical Story, with the participation of Jazz Band of Igor Butman (Russia-US); other soloists include Allan Harris (US), Sanya Kroitor (Israel), Yakov Yavno (US), Igor Butman, Mikhail Gluz (Russia), Polina Zizak (Russia) and other celebrities.

On 30 July 2015, she returned, after 41 years, to Byblos, Lebanon for the Byblos International Festival. Her sisters (manager) Monique, and Marie France accompanied her mother on the trip, who then made a brief appearance with her on stage, escorted by the family servant Hervé-Marc.

On 20 March 2016, Mathieu's mother died at the age of 94 from a pulmonary embolism. She was entombed in the mausoleum Mathieu at the Saint-Véran cemetery in Avignon.

In 2018 she recorded a new album, Mes Classiques, with the Prague Symphonix Ensemble, conductor Jerome Kuhn and orchestra work Thierry Bienaymé, who is the new conductor for Mathieu, since Jean Claudric retired. 

2018 is also the year of her last tour in Germany including a concert in Hamburg's brand new concert hall "Elb Philharmonie." The German press was enthusiastic and hailed her performance.

Since 2020, concerts planned in Sofia, Bulgaria and Russia having been announced several times and then cancelled due to the health crisis. The war in Ukraine now makes it impossible for Mathieu to be in Russia, like any other French artist. Mathieu strongly condemns the invasion of Ukraine by Russia and cries every day, said Isabelle Morini-Bosc, her friend journalist.

Personal life
Mathieu does not have a publicist, or feel the need to expound on her private life. She is a devout Catholic and attends Catholic Mass with her family.

Discography

List of songs recorded by Mireille Mathieu

Bibliography
 Oui, je crois (Yes, I believe), with Jacqueline Cartier, Paris, Robert Laffont, 1987
 Моя судьба. История Любви (My Destiny. Love Story),  Google Books, Translation by Jacob Zalmanovich, Moscow, Litres, 1991

References

External links
 
  

1946 births
Living people
Musicians from Avignon
French women singers
German-language singers
Spanish-language singers of France
Russian-language singers
English-language singers from France
Italian-language singers
Officiers of the Légion d'honneur
Officers Crosses of the Order of Merit of the Federal Republic of Germany
French women pop singers
Musicians with dyslexia
French Roman Catholics